The development of an animal model of autism is one approach researchers use to study potential causes of autism. Given the complexity of autism and its etiology, researchers often focus only on single features of autism when using animal models.

Rodent model
One of the more common rodent models is the Norway rat (Rattus norvegicus). More recent research has used the house mouse (Mus musculus) to model autism because it is a social species. Other strains of mice used include mu opioid receptor knockout mice, as well as Fmr1 knockout mice; the latter are also used as animal models of Fragile X syndrome.

The Norway rat has been used, for example, by Mady Hornig to implicate thiomersal in autism. The current scientific consensus is that no convincing scientific evidence supports these claims, and major scientific and medical bodies such as the Institute of Medicine and World Health Organization (WHO) as well as governmental agencies such as the U.S. Food and Drug Administration (FDA) and Centers for Disease Control and Prevention (CDC) reject any role for thiomersal in autism or other neurodevelopmental disorders.

Behaviors measured in these models include approach to olfactory pheromones emitted by other mice, approach to familiar and new conspecifics, reciprocal social interactions, ultrasonic vocalizations, communal nesting, sexual and parenting behaviors, territorial scent marking, and aggressive behaviors, as well as motor behaviors such as gait. Social interaction is measured by how the mouse interacts with a stranger mouse introduced in the opposite side of a test box.

Researchers from the University of Florida have used deer mice to study restricted and repetitive behavior such as compulsive grooming, and how these behaviors may be caused by specific gene mutations. In addition, Craig Powell of the University of Texas Southwestern Medical Center, with a grant from Autism Speaks, is currently using mice to examine the potential role of neuroligin gene mutations in causing autism. Much research has been done into the use of a rat model to show how Borna virus infection, exposure to valproic acid in utero, and maternal immune activation may cause autism.

Another goal of the use of rodent models to study autism is to identify the mechanism by which autism develops in humans. Other researchers have developed an autism severity score to measure the degree of severity of the mice's autism, as well as the use of scent marking behavior and vocalization distress as models for communication.

It has been observed that mice lacking the gene for oxytocin exhibit deficits in social interaction, and that it may be possible to develop treatments for autism based on abnormalities in this and other neuropeptides.

Environmental Factors of ASD

Looking at the environmental factors of autistic spectrum disorder in rodents helps us to understand the neuropathology of the disorder which can be compared to humans. Environmental factors have been studied in animal rodent models and have been seen to influence brain development and play a role in CNS neuropathology. For example, one study found that a possible environmental contributor to autism may be agents like prenatal exposure to air pollution or any birth difficulty leading to periods of oxygen deprivation to the brain, which alter serotonin levels in early development of the rodent1. This study also found that if the parent exhibits autism, the offspring are more likely to be autistic as well and that since older men have a higher number of DNA mutations in their sperm, these mutations are usually found in the offspring of older men. The last major result that this study observed was that environmental factors during and after pregnancy may have an impact on the immune system as well as the developing nervous system and plays a part in creating neurodevelopmental disorders like autism1. Since environmental factors can occur at any time during the developmental process, there is much variability in the neural and behavioral phenotype of autism. The environment can cause unknown changes in brain development of rodents because they don't all live in the same habitat and therefore might develop different changes to their brain than what is expected.

Maternal immune activation has also been associated with increased risk for development of neurodevelopmental disorders. Maternal immune activation is when inflammatory pathways are activated during pregnancy, usually by an infection. These inflammatory pathways involve the release of cytokines, or immune signaling proteins. Injection of Poly(I:C), which is an immunostimulant and mimics viral infection, to pregnant rodents has been shown to induce an inflammatory response in the brain of the offspring, induce structural brain changes in the offspring, and bring about behavioral changes such as hyperactivity, more aggressive behavior, and less social behavior in the offspring. In addition to viral infection, lipopolysaccharides (LPS) has been used to mimic bacterial infection in rodents in order to observe the effects on the offspring. LPS had similar effects as Poly(I:C) on the immune system of the offspring, increasing inflammation. This inflammatory state in the offspring lasted until adulthood, indicating the long-lasting effects of maternal immune activation. Overall, recent studies make a case for infection during pregnancy being an environmental risk factor for neurodevelopmental disorders such as ASD or schizophrenia in rodents.

Genetic and Phenotypic Factors of ASD

There have been six autism-related genes that are linked to the X chromosome when it comes to autistic spectrum disorder.5 The first gene that has been linked to autism is the Fragile X mental retardation gene (Fmr1). For example, rodents with this gene exhibit elevated cortical spine densities that are similar to those found in autism as well as decreased social behaviors. Another gene that has been linked to autism is methyl-CpG- binding protein type 2 gene (MECP2). In the rodent models that have MECP2 disruption, the rodents are usually normal up until the sixteenth week of age and then they start to develop extreme anxiety in the field, reduced nest building, and poor social interactions which are all symptoms of autism1. The third and fourth genes that have been linked to autism are neuroligin (NLGN) 3 and 4 genes. One study found that mutations in the NLGN 3 and 4 genes lead to loss of neuroligin processing to stimulate the formation of synapses which is a feature of autistic spectrum disorders2. The fifth and sixth genes that are linked to autism are the tuberous sclerosis genes (TSC1 and TSC2). Mutations in one of these two genes cause multiple benign tumors to grow in multiple tissues like the brain2. Lastly, many of the abnormalities found in autistic spectrum disorders involve the mTOR signaling pathway, the GABA - containing neurons, and the immune system.

Human Autism Spectrum Disorder

Understanding human neurodevelopmental disorders often requires adequate models to understand the overall nature of the disorder and the general impacts the disorder makes on the brain itself. Naturally each disorder has different implications when it comes to genetic makeup, phenotypically and genotypically, and generally this impacts particular brain regions. In Autism Spectrum Disorder (ASD) it is generally seen in reduced developmental growth within the brain, and more specifically reduced gray matter within the medial temporal lobe (MTL), which is where the amygdala and hippocampus are located. This is critical in understanding Autism because this region of the brain controls emotions and learning, which is symptomatically linked to ASD. In addition, this supports the need for animal models that establish a greater understanding of what effects these particular brain regions and genetics have on development, and if there are measures we can take to prevent the onset of the disorder3.

Neuropathology of the Underdeveloped Synapse

Autism Spectrum Disorder (ASD) is caused by developmental delays that cause the brain to have lower connectivity within particularly important regions. The synapses within the brain have critical importance in development in young children, especially during their critical period. Autistic brains often have delayed or early critical periods, causing complications within the brain's developmental stages and ability to create stronger synapses for basic communication and stimulus recognition4. Furthermore, the brain's lessened development and cognitive delays are usually observable within the genetics and grey matter within the brain3.

Rodent models have been established as good examples because their brains are akin to humans in makeup. Additionally, they have similar social interactions and relationships that humans have, which shows the social development symptoms often used to diagnose ASD. Rodents when used as models are compared to their normal developed brains, but to replicate ASD, the rodents are lesioned prior to birth using prenatal valproate (VPA). The rodents then experience similar symptoms and developmental changes that occur with human's with ASD. Human's with ASD are identified to have a single-gene mutation at Neuroligin-3, or NL-3 R451C. These particularly simple changes to the rodents and human brains impact them greatly in their ability to develop properly4.

Neuropathology of GABA Receptors

Rodents, most especially mice, are excellent animal models of autism because they have similar social relationships and neuroscience. When exposed to prenatal valproate (VPA) during pregnancy, the mice are born with basic deformities and the developmental delays seen symptomatically in humans5. This is all comparable and easier to study since the lifespan of mice and most rodents is shorter, so being able to understand the genetics, minute effects, and test methods to reduce the onset of the disorder allows for researchers to develop new treatment methods quickly and effectively to help humans on the spectrum. Additionally, these rodents may trace back particular models to how the developmental delays occur in relation to GABA5. GABA is a neurotransmitter that is generally seen as inhibitory, but prior to birth and in early development of the brain it is often excitatory while neurons establish proper brain chemistry. During development there are specific times, called critical periods, where the brain is more capable of acquiring neural connections which usually leads to new behavioral and psychological skills. GABA's change from excitatory to inhibitory, as well as other neurotransmitter changes during these critical developmental stages can impact the development the brain goes through. If the critical period is early, growth can be limited, slowed, or even stunted early on. Additionally, if it is later, the brain's development is measured as complete incorrectly which may limit its ability to improve connectivity. Overall, the brain's circuitry and communication is often limited or poor within ASD, so using rodent models to study these limitations and where they come about increases researchers' understanding of the disorder and potential ways to prevent it5.

Songbird model
In 2012, a researcher from the University of Nebraska at Kearney published a study reviewing research that had been done using the songbird as a model for autism spectrum disorders, noting that the neurobiology of vocalization is similar between humans and songbirds, and that, in both species, social learning plays a central role in the development of the ability to vocalize. Other research using this model has been done by Stephanie White at the University of California Los Angeles, who studied mutations in the FOXP2 gene and its potential role in learned vocalization in both songbirds (specifically the zebra finch) and humans.

Controversy
In 2013, a study was published by Swiss researchers which concluded that 91% (31 out of the 34 studies reviewed) of valproic acid-autism studies using animal models suffered from statistical flaws—specifically, they had failed to correctly use the litter as a level of statistical analysis rather than just the individual (i.e., an individual mouse or rat).

References

Other sources

Animal cognition
Causes of autism
 Autism